James Ross Wildlife Reservation is a South Carolina Wildlife Management Area located near York and Sharon managed by the South Carolina Department of Natural Resources.

History
The property is believed to be named after James Ross, born in 1744, and who owned 300 acres of land in the Bethesda area. Ross fought on the side of  the Patriots during the Battle of Huck’s Defeat in 1780 near Brattonsville, South Carolina.
The  South Carolina Department of Natural Resources (DNR) established The James Ross Wildlife Reservation on October 4, 1995. The 305 acre plat of land was donated to the DNR by Ms. Kitty W. Sandifer, a retired school teacher from nearby York, SC. Ms. Sandifer was born on the property and lived to be 96 years of age before her death in February 1994. In her will, drawn up by John Spratt, Ms. Sandifer requested that this property be known as the James Ross Wildlife Reservation. A parking area is available and a sign dedicating the tract is present.

Activities and amenities
Trails: There are two trails on the property. A portion of the  Triple C Rail Trail, running east–west from York to Sharon, also crosses the property.
Hunting: Hunting of white-tailed deer, wild turkey, small game and furbearers is allowed within the Game Zone 2 seasons and bag limits.
Nature Viewing: Pine timber stands comprise about 150 acres and are primarily natural shortleaf, some Virginia pine and two small areas of loblolly pine. A significant number of desirable mast-producing hardwood species such as red oak, white oak, hickory, beech and dogwood occur on the tract and account for approximately 145 acres. Several small wildlife openings are present.

References

External links
SCDNR Managed Lands: James Ross Wildlife Reservatiion
Triple C Rail Trail information page

Wildlife management areas of South Carolina
Protected areas of York County, South Carolina